This is a list of Australian films released in 2016.

2016

References

 2016 in Australia
 2016 in Australian television
 List of 2016 box office number-one films in Australia

2016
Lists of 2016 films by country or language
Films